Palamu division is one of the five divisions of Jharkhand state in eastern India. This division comprises three districts: Garhwa, Latehar and Palamu. Medininagar (formerly known as Daltonganj) town is the administrative headquarters of the division. This division was created on 2 May 1992. It has a population of 3,989,631.

Languages

References

Divisions of Jharkhand